Tite is a Guinea-Bissauan football club based in Tite. They play in the division amateur in Guinean football.

Current squad

Tite